Jack Gibson (born August 18, 1948) is a Canadian former professional ice hockey left winger.

Early life 
Gibson was born in Picton, Ontario. He played junior hockey with the Moose Jaw Canucks and was a member of the Alberta Golden Bears at the University of Alberta.

Career 
Gibson played 122 games in the World Hockey Association. He was a member of the Ottawa Nationals and Toronto Toros.

References

External links
 

1948 births
Alberta Golden Bears ice hockey players
Canadian ice hockey left wingers
Clinton Comets players
Ice hockey people from Ontario
Living people
Mohawk Valley Comets players
Ottawa Nationals players
Toronto Toros players
Canadian expatriate ice hockey players in the United States

Moose Jaw Canucks players